Nactus soniae is a species of lizard in the family Gekkonidae. It is endemic to Réunion. It is probably extinct as this species has been described based on subfossil remains and DNA data. It is named after Sonia Ribes-Beaudemoulin, the curator of the Muséum d’Histoire  Naturelle, Saint-Denis, La Réunion, who organized expeditions to collect fossils on Réunion Island.

References

Nactus
Reptiles described in 2008